Belyovo is a village in Sandanski Municipality, in Blagoevgrad Province, Bulgaria.

References

Villages in Blagoevgrad Province